The Gay Deception is a 1935 romantic comedy film starring Francis Lederer and Frances Dee. Writers Stephen Morehouse Avery and Don Hartman were nominated for the Academy Award for Best Story.

Plot

Secretary Mirabel Miller (Frances Dee) wins a lottery and decides to live it up in a luxurious New York hotel (The Waldorf-Plaza), where she clashes with a bellboy (Francis Lederer) who is more than he appears to be.

Cast
 Francis Lederer as Sandro (Prince Alessandro)
 Frances Dee as Mirabel Miller
 Benita Hume as Miss Cordelia Channing
 Alan Mowbray as Lord Clewe
 Lennox Pawle as Consul-General Semanek
 Adele St. Mauer as Lucille (as Adele St. Maur)
 Akim Tamiroff as Spellek
 Luis Alberni as Ernest
 Lionel Stander as Gettel
 Ferdinand Gottschalk as Mr. Squires
 Richard Carle as Mr. Spitzer
 Lenita Lane as Peg DeForrest
 Barbara Fritchie as Joan Dennison
 Paul Hurst as Bell Captain
 Robert Greig as Adolph

External links
 
 
 

1935 films
American black-and-white films
Films directed by William Wyler
1935 romantic comedy films
American romantic comedy films
20th Century Fox films
Fox Film films
1930s English-language films
1930s American films
Silent romantic comedy films